The men's 200 metre breaststroke at the 2007 World Aquatics Championships took place on 29 March (heats and semifinals) and on the evening of 30 March (final) at Rod Laver Arena in Melbourne, Australia. 85 swimmers were entered in the event, of which 79 swam.

Existing records at the start of the event were:
World record (WR): 2:08.50, Brendan Hansen (USA), 20 August 2006 in Victoria, Canada.
Championship record (CR): 2:09.42, Kosuke Kitajima (Japan), Barcelona 2003 (24 July 2003)

Results

Finals

Semifinals

Heats

See also
Swimming at the 2005 World Aquatics Championships – Men's 200 metre breaststroke
Swimming at the 2008 Summer Olympics – Men's 200 metre breaststroke
Swimming at the 2009 World Aquatics Championships – Men's 200 metre breaststroke

References

Men's 200m Breast Heats results from the 2007 World Championships. Published by OmegaTiming.com (official timer of the '07 Worlds); retrieved 2009-07-11.
Men's 200m Breast Semifinals results from the 2007 World Championships. Published by OmegaTiming.com (official timer of the '07 Worlds); retrieved 2009-07-11.
Men's 200m Breast Final results from the 2007 World Championships. Published by OmegaTiming.com (official timer of the '07 Worlds); retrieved 2009-07-11.

Swimming at the 2007 World Aquatics Championships